GoodData is a software company headquartered in San Francisco, California, in the U.S., with additional offices in Europe and Asia. GoodData provides data and analytics infrastructure, including embeddable analytics and composable data and analytics.

History
GoodData was founded in 2007 by Czech entrepreneur Roman Stanek. Stanek had previously founded and served as CEO at NetBeans, which was acquired by Sun Microsystems in 1999, as well as Systinet Corporation, which was acquired by Hewlett Packard in 2006.

The company was founded in April 2007 as "Good Data Corporation" in Cambridge, Massachusetts.
It received investment in July 2008 from Tim O'Reilly, Esther Dyson, and private equity firm Windcrest Partners for a total sum of $2 million.

In 2009, the company received funding from Andreessen Horowitz, O'Reilly AlphaTech Ventures, General Catalyst Partners, and Windcrest Partners across two rounds totaling $5 million. Funding continued with in 2010, 2011, 2012, and in late 2012, bringing its capital raised to $53.5 million. The company announced $22 million in funding led by TOTVS Ventures in 2013.

In 2014, GoodData said it provided software to 30,000 companies.

In 2019, GoodData announced a partnership with Amazon and the integration with Amazon Redshift data warehouse solution.

On May 20, 2020, GoodData and Visa Inc. announced an investment and strategic partnership.

On July 15, 2021, GoodData announced a partnership with unified analytics platform provider Vertica.

On July 27, 2021, GoodData said it received a $45 million credit facility from J.P. Morgan & Co. to "grow its global sales and engineering teams while continuing to invest in building solutions for modern, enterprise-grade analytics."

Software products
GoodData is a business intelligence and analytics company that is known primarily for its embedded analytics solutions. In 2021, it expanded its cache of capabilities to include GoodData.CN (GoodData Cloud Native) and composable data and analytics.

References

External links
 Official website

Data visualization software
Business software companies
Data companies
Companies based in San Francisco
Software companies established in 2007
Software companies based in the San Francisco Bay Area
2007 establishments in California